Charlotte Avenue–Aiken Avenue Historic District is a national historic district located at Rock Hill, South Carolina.  It encompasses seven contributing dwellings in the Oakland section of Rock Hill. The district developed between about 1891 and 1935. Architectural styles represented include Classical Revival, Queen Anne, and Bungalow.  Contributing buildings are the Hughes Walker House, Paul D. Farris House, Roy Z. Thomas House, Wilson House (Ark of the Covenant), Armstrong-Mauldin House, and Bays-Blackman House.

It was listed on the National Register of Historic Places in 1992.

References

Historic districts on the National Register of Historic Places in South Carolina
Houses on the National Register of Historic Places in South Carolina
Neoclassical architecture in South Carolina
Queen Anne architecture in South Carolina
Buildings and structures in Rock Hill, South Carolina
National Register of Historic Places in Rock Hill, South Carolina
Houses in York County, South Carolina